Luca Jensen (born 1 January 1998) is a German professional footballer who plays as a midfielder for Greifswalder FC.

Career
Jensen joined KFC Uerdingen 05 as a free agent in October 2021, following a trial.

References

External links
 

1998 births
Living people
German footballers
People from Kaiserslautern
Footballers from Rhineland-Palatinate
Association football midfielders
3. Liga players
Oberliga (football) players
Regionalliga players
1. FC Kaiserslautern II players
1. FC Kaiserslautern players
KFC Uerdingen 05 players